USS Kodiak may refer to the following ships of the United States Navy:

 was launched 27 June 1944 and decommissioned 19 April 1965
 was launched 26 October 1945 and sunk as a target in 1988

United States Navy ship names